Inchmore is the name of several places in Ireland and Scotland:
Inchmore, Kirkhill
Inchmore, Strathfarrar
Inchmore, a townland in Coolcraheen civil parish, County Kilkenny, Ireland
Inchmore, a townland in Freshford civil parish, County Kilkenny, Ireland
Inchmore, a townland in County Longford, Ireland
Inchmore, a townland in County Westmeath, Ireland

Other
Inchmore (Tiernan), a townland in County Westmeath, Ireland